Spermosin is an enzyme. This enzyme catalyses the following chemical reaction

 Hydrolyses arginyl bonds, preferably with Pro in the P2 position

This enzyme is isolated from the ascidian (Prochordate) Halocynthia roretzi.

References

External links 
 

EC 3.4.21